Ana-Maria Afuie is a Samoan rugby union player. She represents Samoa internationally in rugby union and sevens. She plays at Halfback, Fullback and Wing.

Personal life 
Afuie attended St Catherine's College in Wellington and is of Samoan and Māori descent. Her father is Samoan, her grandmother is from Falefa and her grandfather is from Solosolo and Vailele. Her mother is from Tūrangi and is from Ngāti Tūwharetoa and Ngāti Porou iwi.

Rugby career 
Afuie plays provincially for Wellington Pride and club rugby for Marist St Pats. In 2020, she played for the Manusina XV's team against a Port Taranaki Women's Invitational XV. It was a trial match for selectors to finalise the Manusina team. She eventually made the Manusina team, they thrashed Tonga 40–0 and progressed to the Final Qualification Tournament for the 2021 Rugby World Cup.

Afuie was named in the Hurricanes Poua squad for the inaugural season of Super Rugby Aupiki.

References 

Living people
Samoa women's national rugby union team players
Samoa female rugby sevens players
Samoan sportswomen
Year of birth missing (living people)
Ngāti Tūwharetoa people
Ngāti Porou people